Hurleston is a civil parish in the unitary authority of Cheshire East and the ceremonial county of Cheshire, England, which lies to the north west of Nantwich. The parish is predominantly rural with scattered farms and buildings and no settlements. Nearby villages include Barbridge, Burland, Radmore Green, Rease Heath and Stoke Bank.

According to the 2001 census, the parish had a population of 64. At the 2011 Census the population remained less than 100. Details are included in the civil parish of Stoke, Cheshire East.

Governance
Hurleston is administered by Stoke and Hurleston Parish Council jointly with the adjacent civil parish of Stoke. From 1974 the civil parish was served by Crewe and Nantwich Borough Council, which was succeeded on 1 April 2009 by the unitary authority of Cheshire East. Hurleston falls in the parliamentary constituency of Eddisbury, which has been represented by Edward Timpson since 2019, after being represented by Stephen O'Brien (1999–2015) and Antoinette Sandbach (2015–19).

Geography and transport
The civil parish includes several small deciduous and mixed woodlands including Bachehouse Covert, and also the mere of Bachehouse Pool and most of Hurleston Reservoir.

The Shropshire Union Canal splits into two branches at Hurleston Junction and both branches run through the parish. The main line runs north–south, while the Llangollen branch at first runs westwards, descending 34 feet via the four Hurleston Locks, and then turns southwards. The A51 runs north–south through the parish, crossing the Llangollen branch of the canal at Hurleston Bridge. The A534 forms part of the southern boundary of the civil parish.

See also

Listed buildings in Hurleston
 Snugburys, an ice cream manufacturer in Hurleston

References

External links

 Genuki: Hurleston

Civil parishes in Cheshire
Villages in Cheshire